The Revelation is the 45th book in the Animorphs series, written by K.A. Applegate.  It is known to have been ghostwritten by Ellen Geroux. It is the first book in the ten-book arc that finalized the story of the Animorphs.  It is narrated by Marco.

Plot summary
While having dinner with his family, Marco learns that his father, Peter, is involved in research that has led to the discovery of Zero-Space. When the Yeerks learn of Peter's research, they try to have him infested. The Yeerks plan is thwarted by Marco and Rachel, but at the expense of Marco losing his cover. With no alternative, Marco tells his father about the Yeerk invasion of Earth, the role he has played in the war, and tells him that they can no longer return home, even to save his wife, Nora. Marco also finally reveals the fate of his mother, Eva, telling his father that she is the host of Visser One.

After hiding his father with the Chee, Marco speaks with the other Animorphs at Cassie's barn and tells them of what has transpired. Rachel suggests using the Z-Space transmitter created by Peter to intercept Yeerk transmissions, but the device is currently in the custody of the Yeerks. Ax is enlisted to help Peter re-build the transmitter.

Meanwhile, Erek King and his "father" are posing as Marco and Peter at Marco's former home. The two are seen packing for a trip to Acapulco when four human-Controllers break into the room and fire their Dracon beams at "Marco" and "Peter", vaporizing the bodies. The Yeerks briefly speak to Nora, who has since been infested, and she follows the Controllers off the property. After verifying that the coast is clear, Marco, who was hiding in the house as a cockroach, demorphs and Erek shuts down the hologram hiding himself and Mr. King. Erek takes minimal damage in the Yeerk assault, but Mr. King needs more extensive repairs. Erek carries Mr. King back to their home disguised as a garbage truck, leaving Marco alone to contemplate what his life will be like until the end of the war.

Several days later, the Animorphs and Peter assemble at Ax's scoop. The Z-Space transmitter is nearly complete, and is already picking up several Yeerk transmissions. Ax is having trouble stabilizing the transmitter's translator chip, which is only able to translate for brief periods of time. However, Ax is able to interpret enough of the transmissions to learn that Visser One is being sent back to Earth to be executed as a traitor. The Yeerks are only awaiting the arrival of a witness from the Council of Thirteen, at which point the execution will commence and Visser Three will be promoted to Visser One. Ax also suggests that the execution of Visser One and Visser Three's impending promotion is the beginning of a change in how the Yeerks plan to conquer Earth. With this information in mind, the Animorphs decide to attempt to rescue Marco's mother. The Animorphs and Peter begin planning the operation.

Later in the forest, Marco calls the local police department, which is known to be infiltrated by the Yeerks, and reports that he has an alien in his custody. After giving them the description of a Hork-Bajir and his location, he hangs up and waits for a Yeerk Bug fighter to arrive. The fighter comes four minutes later, and the two Hork-Bajir-Controllers on-board are quickly disabled by Jake and Rachel. Cassie and Ax take out the Taxxon pilot, allowing the Animorphs to commandeer the Bug fighter.

Despite some difficulty piloting the fighter, Ax manages to get them inside the hangar connected to the Yeerk pool complex. The Animorphs disembark and make their way to the Yeerk pool in Hork-Bajir morphs. They find Visser One tied up on the infestation pier, her execution already underway. The Animorphs attempt to make their way back to their stolen Bug fighter, but are forced to fight several suspicious Hork-Bajir-Controllers en route. Upon reaching the fighter, Ax flies it to the Yeerk pool and Marco and Rachel jump down to retrieve Eva. Unfortunately, a second Bug fighter, along with Visser Three himself, engages the one captured by the Animorphs, leaving Marco and Rachel forced to engage several Blue Band Hork-Bajir while they wait for rescue. After several minutes of battle, Visser Three is disabled and the second Bug fighter is destroyed. Visser One leaves Eva and attempts to make her way to the Yeerk pool, only to be stepped on by Marco. Marco, Rachel, and Eva board the Animorphs' stolen Bug fighter and are flown to safety. Once clear of the Yeerk pool complex, the fighter is abandoned in the forest and is destroyed by the Yeerks.

Eva's injuries are treated by the Chee, and she and Peter are relocated to the free Hork-Bajir colony. Peter pulls Marco aside and asks if there was anything that could be done to save Nora. Marco tells him that she was likely a Controller all along, assigned to spy on Peter and his research projects. The explanation is a lie, but Peter accepts it and reunites with Eva.

Several nights later, the Animorphs assemble at the beach. Ax uses the Z-Space transmitter to call the Andalite homeworld. The Andalites demand to know who is making the transmission, to which Jake responds, "This is Earth."

Contributions to the series' story arc
Marco tells his father, Peter, about the Yeerk invasion.
Marco and Peter fake their deaths and are forced into hiding.
The Blue Band Hork-Bajir are introduced.
Visser One (Edriss 562) is killed and Marco's mother, Eva, is liberated by the Animorphs, and she is reunited with Marco and Peter.

Trivia
 This book was sold in a clear cellophane wrapper, also containing a CD featuring a demo of the Animorphs PC game.
 The cover morph is never actually completed in the book. In order to give his father proof of his story about the war against the Yeerks, Marco half-morphs into an ant and an osprey in front of him, never fully completing either morph.
 This is the fourteenth book to feature a cover morph that was not acquired in the book. Marco acquired his ant morph in the fifth book, The Predator.
 The front cover quote is "Sometimes there's no escape. Even for the Animorphs..."
 The inside front cover quote is "Sometimes the truth won't set you free...."
 At the bottom of the last page of the last chapter are the words "We do know who they are... and we know you, too..."

Themes
The ant morph featured on the cover of The Revelation is not central to the plot, but holds special meaning for Marco; it was one of the morphs he feared most, and vowed to never do again after the Animorphs used it in The Predator; the loss of control he felt as an ant was too much for him to assimilate.  In The Revelation, Marco's world is finally, definitively turned upside down; the book marks the point in the character's life where he can no longer, or must no longer, keep up the illusion of living a normal life, for the benefit of himself and the Yeerks who could be watching him.

Morphs

Animorphs books
2000 science fiction novels